Beowulf & Grendel is a 2005 Canadian-Icelandic fantasy adventure film directed by Sturla Gunnarsson, loosely based on the Anglo-Saxon epic poem Beowulf. It stars Gerard Butler as Beowulf, Stellan Skarsgård as Hrothgar, Ingvar Eggert Sigurðsson as Grendel and Sarah Polley as the witch Selma. The screenplay was written by Andrew Rai Berzins. The soundtrack was composed by Hilmar Örn Hilmarsson.

The film was a cooperative effort among Eurasia Motion Pictures (Canada), Spice Factory (UK), and Bjolfskvida (Iceland), and it was filmed in Iceland.

In 2006, a documentary of the difficult making of Beowulf and Grendel, called Wrath of Gods, was released and went on to win six film awards in Europe and the U.S.

Setting
While some of the film remains true to the original poem, other plot elements deviate from the original poem: four new characters (Grendel's father, the witch Selma, Father Brendan, and Grendel's son) are introduced, and several related plot points were developed specifically for the film.

The story takes place in the early half of the 6th century CE in what is now Denmark, but the filming of the movie in Iceland provided many panoramic views of that country's landscape.

Plot

In 500 CE, Hrothgar, king of Denmark, and a group of warriors chase a large and burly man, whom they consider a troll, and his young son, who already bears cheek and chin whiskers, to the edge of a steep seaside cliff. The father directs his young son, Grendel, to hide from the attackers' view; whereupon The Danes shoot the father dead, and his dead body plunges onto the beach far below. The Danish king sees the young Grendel, but spares him. Later, Grendel finds his father's body and cuts the head off to take it home. Many years later, the severed (and mummified) head is inside a cave, apparently the centerpiece of a primitive memorial. The boy Grendel has now become as large and powerful as his father, and contemplating the head, he plans revenge.

When Hrothgar finds twenty of his warriors killed inside his great hall, the Danish king falls into a depression. Beowulf, with the permission of Hygelac, king of Geatland, sails to Denmark with thirteen Geats to slay Grendel for Hrothgar. The arrival of Beowulf and his warriors is welcomed by Hrothgar, but the king's village has fallen into a deep despair and many of the pagan villagers convert to Christianity at the urging of an Irish monk. While Grendel does raid Hrothgar's village during the night, he flees rather than fight. Selma the witch tells Beowulf that Grendel will not fight him because Beowulf has committed no wrong against him.

A villager, recently baptized and thus now unafraid of death, leads Beowulf and his men to the cliff above Grendel's cave. However, the Geats do not enter, having no rope to climb down the cliff. When the villager is found dead, Beowulf and his men return with a rope and gain entry to Grendel's secret cave, where one of Beowulf's men mutilates the mummified head of Grendel's father. That night, Grendel invades Hrothgar's great hall, kills the Geat who desecrated his father's head, and leaps from the second story, but is caught in a trap by Beowulf. Grendel, refusing capture, escapes by severing his captive arm. He flees to the beach and collapses into the water, where his body is claimed by a mysterious webbed hand. Thereafter Hrothgar admits to Beowulf that he had killed Grendel's father for stealing a fish but had spared the child Grendel out of pity. Grendel's severed arm is kept by the Danes as a trophy. In revealing more about Grendel, Selma recounts that Grendel had once clumsily raped her and has protected her since that day; and Beowulf becomes her paramour. The Geats and Danes proceed to nail Grendel's arm to the rafters of the hall as a trophy.

At night, the Danes are later attacked by Grendel's mother, the Sea Hag, who kills some men and reclaims her son's arm. Beowulf and the Geats return to Grendel's cave a third time to investigate. They find an underwater passage hidden in a pond within the cave. Beowulf dives through this passage and find Grendel's body in the cave on the other end. When examining the body, he is suddenly attacked by the Sea Hag and  slays her with a sword from among her treasure. He then notices that the battle had been observed by the child of Grendel and Selma. Later Beowulf, with Grendel's son watching, buries Grendel with ceremony. Shortly thereafter, Beowulf and his band of Geats leave Denmark by ship, having warned Selma that she must hide her son, lest the Danes destroy him.

Cast

 Gerard Butler as Beowulf
 Stellan Skarsgård as Hrothgar
 Ingvar E. Sigurðsson as Grendel
Hringur Ingvarsson as Young Grendel
 Sarah Polley as Selma
 Eddie Marsan as Father Brendan
 Tony Curran as Hondscioh
 Ronan Vibert as Thorkel
 Rory McCann as Breca
 Martin Delaney as Thorfinn
 Spencer Wilding as Grendel's Father
 Gunnar Eyjólfsson as Aeschere
 Philip Whitchurch as Fisherman
 Mark Lewis as Hygelac
 Elva Ósk Ólafsdóttir as Sea Hag
 Ólafur Darri Ólafsson as Unferth
 Steinunn Ólína Thorsteinsdóttir as Wealhtheow
 Gísli Örn Garðarsson as Erik
 Gunnar Hansson as Grímur
 Benedikt Clausen as Selma's Child
 Steindór Andersen as Snorri
 Matt John Evans as Geat Warrior #1
 Jon Gustafsson as Geat Warrior #2
 Þröstur Leó Gunnarsson as Guard
 Arnór Hákonarsson as Kid #1
 Thórdur Helgi Gudjónsson as Kid #2
 Kristín Gunnarsdottir as Dead Woman
 Ólafur Egill Ólafsson as Necrophile
 Helgi Björnsson as Man

Reception
On review aggregator Rotten Tomatoes, Beowulf and Grendel holds an approval rating of 47%, based on 34 reviews, and an average rating of 5.42/10. Its consensus reads, "Despite the impressive Icelandic scenery, Beowulf And Grendel fails to find its footing in the transition from epic tale to the big screen." On Metacritic, the film has a weighted average score of 53 out of 100, based on 16 critics, indicating "mixed or average reviews".

Todd McCarthy of Variety stated that the film was "too genteel" in spite of its impressive cinematography and believability. Mick LaSalle from The San Francisco Chronicle felt that, by attempting to make the classic legend a morality tale, it lessened the film's impact, also criticizing Polley as being miscast. The New York Timess Manohla Dargis gave the film two out of four stars, commenting that, while it featured excellent cinematography and production values, the film was undone by its reinterperatation of Grendel and removal of all the mystical elements of the original story. Nick Schager of Slant Magazine offered similar criticism, stating that the film "fail[ed] to generate a requisite degree of mythic grandeur" which greatly diminished the scope and power of the original epic. Schager also criticized the film's added vulgarity, and Polley's casting.

The film was not without its supporters: Entertainment Weeklys Lisa Schwarzbaum commended the film for its naturalistic approach, and its direction.

References

External links
Beowulf & Grendel Official Site

 
 Beowulf & Grendel at Metacritic

2005 films
2000s fantasy adventure films
English-language Canadian films
English-language Icelandic films
Canadian fantasy adventure films
Films based on European myths and legends
Films based on Beowulf
Films based on Norse mythology
Films directed by Sturla Gunnarsson
Films scored by Hilmar Örn Hilmarsson
Films set in Denmark
Films set in the 6th century
Films set in the Viking Age
Films shot in Iceland
2000s English-language films
2000s Canadian films